Cheonan Ssangyong High School is a public high school located in Cheonan, South Korea.

References

External links 
 Cheonan Ssangyong High School Website 

Cheonan
High schools in South Korea
Schools in South Chungcheong Province
Educational institutions established in 2004
2004 establishments in South Korea